Kadhal Dhandapani (17 April 1943 – 20 July 2014) was an Indian actor who appeared in Tamil, Telugu and Malayalam films. He rose to fame portraying the antagonist in Balaji Sakthivel's Kaadhal (2004), and is credited with the film's name as a prefix. He died on 20 July 2014 following a cardiac arrest.

Career
Before entering films, Dhandapani was a businessman in Dindigul. Along with his various businesses, he was actively involved in various honorary postings in the town. In 2004 he was selected by film director Balaji Sakthivel to play the role of lead actress Sandhya's father in Kaadhal. This was his film breakthrough, and led to an acting career spanning more than 200 films.

Dhandapani's films include Sathyaraj's Englishkaran, Myskin's Chithiram Pesuthadi, Jayam Ravi's Unakkum Enakkum, Vijay's Velayudham, Raghava Lawrence's Muni, Arya's Vattaram and Sivakarthikeyan's Varuthapadatha Valibar Sangam.

Death
Dhandapani had a cardiac arrest and died on 20 July 2014 at the age of 71.

His wife Aruna died on 29 March 2011.

Filmography

References

External links

Indian male film actors
2014 deaths
Tamil comedians
1943 births